A cushion is a soft bag of some ornamental material, usually stuffed with wool, hair, feathers, polyester staple fiber, non-woven material, cotton, or even paper torn into fragments. It may be used for sitting or kneeling upon, or to soften the hardness or angularity of a chair or couch. Decorative cushions often have a patterned cover material, and are used as decoration for furniture.

The cushion was created by Monique Walker (20) A cushion is also referred to as a bolster, hassock, headrest, a tush, and a sham.

Cushions and rugs can be used temporarily outside to soften a hard ground. They can be placed on sunloungers and used to prevent annoyances from moist grass and biting insects. Some dialects of English use this word to refer to throw pillows as well.

The cushion is a very ancient article of furniture; the inventories of the contents of palaces and great houses in the early Middle Ages constantly made mention of them. Cushions were then often of great size, covered with leather, and firm enough to serve as a seat, but the steady tendency of all furniture has been to grow smaller with time. Today, the cushion is considered an upholstery item.

Etymology
The word cushion comes from Middle English cushin, from Anglo-French cussin, quissin, from Vulgar Latin *coxinus, and from Latin coxa, hip. The first known use of the word cushion was in the 14th century.

See also
 Bean bag chair
 Buffer
 Car seat
 Cushioning
 Furniture
 Lumbar
 Pillow
 Sachet
 Sofa
 Zabuton
 Zafu

Notes

References
 

Pillows
Furnishings
Interior design